Juan Carlos Molina may refer to:
 Juan Carlos Molina Merlos (born 1974), Paralympic cyclist and skier from Spain
 Juan Carlos Molina (footballer) (born 1955), footballer from Argentina